Slava Seidel (born 1974) is a German painter.

Early life 
Seidel was born in Kryvyi Rih, Ukraine (formerly Soviet Ukraine).

Education 
In 1999, she moved to Germany.
In 2002, Seidel studied at the State Academy of Fine Arts (Städelschule) in Frankfurt am Main, and was a master student in professional free painting, where she studied with Christa Näher. In 2008, Seidel graduated.

Personal life 
Seidel lives in Wetzlar.

Awards 
 2018: Winner of Phönix Art Award, Art Prize for Up-and-coming Artists 
 2013: Fellowship Künstlerhaus Hooksiel 
 2012: Fellowship Atelierhaus Salzamt 
 2011: Fellowship Werkstatt Plettenberg

Selected exhibitions 

 2018 „Phönix Kunstpreis“ Evangelische Akademie Tutzing
 2017 Berlin Art Week Works from the collection SØR Rusche 
 2015 „Franz Josef Strauß“ Munich Stadtmuseum 
 2014 „Slava Seidel“ Städtische Galerie house “Eichenmüller”, Lemgo
 2013  Collection Rusche, Museum Abbey Liesborn
 2013  Kallmann-Museum, Ismaning, Munich
 2010 „Détournement Venise“ Palazzo Albrizzi Cannaregio, Venice Biennale
 2008: Städel Museum, Frankfurt am Main
 2008  Nassauischer Kunstverein Wiesbaden
 2005 „Wide Bridge“, Joensuu Art Museum and Kajaani Art Museum Finland

Bibliography 

 Slava Seidel. sepia, (Verlag für moderne Kunst 2008) 
 Kunstwelten (boesner holding + innovations, 2012)

Collections 
Collections of art that own examples of Seidel's work include:
 Munich Stadtmuseum Munich Stadtmuseum
 "SØR Rusche Collection. Shown artworks are by David Lynch, Miriam Vlaming, Benjamin Bergmann, Andreas Blank, Andreas Golder, Slava Seidel, Oda Jaune"

References

External links 
 Website Slava Seidel
 Slava Seidel – Edge of Illusion 2017

20th-century German painters
20th-century German male artists
Living people
1974 births
Städelschule alumni
21st-century German painters
21st-century German male artists
People from Kryvyi Rih